The Chinese Parrot (1926) is the second novel in the Charlie Chan series of mystery novels by Earl Derr Biggers.  It is the first in which Chan travels from Hawaii to mainland California, and involves a crime whose exposure is hastened by the death of a parrot.

The story concerns a valuable string of pearls which is purchased by a wealthy and eccentric financier.  The handsome young son of the jeweller is assigned to shepherd the transfer of the pearls to the financier's vacation home in a desert area of California.  Because of his long association with the owner of the pearls—before joining the police force, he was her houseboy—Charlie Chan travels from Hawaii to California with the pearls.  After two mysterious deaths, first of a Chinese-speaking parrot and then of the household's Chinese man-of-all-work, Charlie Chan masquerades as a pidgin-speaking cook named Ah Kim and works undercover to solve a number of crimes.  Along the way, the jeweller's son meets a beautiful young woman who works as a location scout and decides to stay in the California desert.

Film, TV or theatrical adaptations
The novel was adapted for film twice, as The Chinese Parrot in 1927 and as Charlie Chan's Courage in 1934 (both of which are considered lost films).

External links
 

1926 American novels
American novels adapted into films
Books about birds
Fictional parrots
Novels set in California
Charlie Chan novels